In the run up to the 2009 Portuguese legislative election, various organisations carried out opinion polling to gauge voting intention in Portugal. Results of such polls are displayed in this article.

The date range for these opinion polls are from the previous general election, held on 20 February 2005, to the day the next election was held, on 27 September 2009.

Nationwide polling

Graphical summary

Polling
Poll results are listed in the table below in reverse chronological order, showing the most recent first. The highest percentage figure in each polling survey is displayed in bold, and the background shaded in the leading party's colour. In the instance that there is a tie, then no figure is shaded but both are displayed in bold. The lead column on the right shows the percentage-point difference between the two parties with the highest figures. Poll results use the date the survey's fieldwork was done, as opposed to the date of publication.

Notes

References

External links 
 Marktest Opinion Poll Tracker
 ERC - Official publication of polls

2009